Jack Landrón (born Juán Cándido Washington y Landrón, June 2, 1938) is an Afro-Puerto Rican folksinger, songwriter, and actor.

Jackie Washington

Born Juán Cándido Washington y Landrón on June 2, 1938, in Puerto Rico, he grew up in the Boston, Massachusetts neighborhood of Roxbury. He studied at Emerson College as a Theater Arts major.  As part of the Cambridge/Boston folk music scene in the early and mid-1960s, he released four albums on Vanguard—Jackie Washington (1962), Jackie Washington/2 (1963), Jackie Washington at Club 47 (1965), and Morning Song (1967); this last LP consisted entirely of original compositions and was his first with a band. [None of his albums has been released on CD but individual songs have appeared on anthologies. His sole single, for instance, "Why Won't They Let Me Be?" (1966), is included in Northern Soul's Classiest Rarities 2 (Kent, 2005).] The live album, Jackie Washington at Club 47, featuring a cover collage by Eric Von Schmidt, is most representative of his act as he had a lot to say between numbers—not only setting up the contexts of the songs but also relating personal anecdotes; indeed, he could easily have worked as a stand-up comedian, and he fully appreciated the early records of Bill Cosby (nowadays, his main man comedically is Chris Rock). Vanguard, however, tried to groom him as a male counterpart to Joan Baez. He now characterizes himself as primarily a storyteller.

While coming home in the early hours of December 3, 1962, Washington was arrested by the Boston Police:  what happened was the subject of dispute, with the police saying that when they questioned him, Washington assaulted one of the officers  and Washington asserting that he was stopped, and subsequently beaten by two officers, for no reason other than his race.  The case resulted in a cause célèbre which Washington's supporters believed had exposed racism in the Boston police force.  Washington was ultimately acquitted of all charges, in a verdict that took the jury only five hours to reach. 
In the summer of 1964 Washington y Landrón participated in Freedom Schools conducted in the South, and three of his performances from his live album are included in the double-CD anthology Freedom Is A Constant Struggle (Songs of the Mississippi Civil Rights Movement) (1994). At one point he was Dr. Martin Luther King's personal assistant in Mississippi.  In 1964, he also teamed for a time with Tony Saletan and Irene Kossoy (formerly and subsequently of the Kossoy Sisters) to form the Boston Folk Trio, which presented school concerts through the non-profit Young Audiences Arts for Learning. "Esta Navidad" from his first album is included in the 1995 Vanguard compilation A Folksinger's Christmas.

Washington's version of the traditional English nonsense song "Nottamun Town" was the tune and arrangement used by Bob Dylan as the basis for "Masters of War", . [Clinton Heylin in Revolution In the Air (2009) rejects this idea as "patently absurd" (p. 116), but Jackie Washington, including "Nottamun Town", was released in December 1962, and The Freewheelin' Bob Dylan, with "Masters of War", was released 27 May 1963; Dylan loved Washington's rendition, repeatedly requested he perform it, and asked Vanguard Records to give him a copy of Washington's debut album; Jean Ritchie, whose version Heylin and others give as Dylan's source, sings the song in a minor key but plays the accompaniment in major chords. Washington reset the melody to minor chords, and in the process changed it somewhat—Dylan liked this version and used it as the model for "Masters of War."] Washington's role in the song's transmission is acknowledged in Bob Dylan by Greil Marcus: Writings 1968–2010 (Public Affairs, 2010, p. 410). Washington taught Joan Baez "There But For Fortune" by Phil Ochs, which provided Baez with her first appearance on the singles chart. (You can tell she learned it from him because he had made a lyric change; where Ochs had written "whose face is growing pale",  Jackie, being black, had substituted "whose life has grown stale"—which is how Baez sings it.)

Originally managed by Manny Greenhill, Joan Baez's manager, Washington later did his own bookings. He is currently managed by Mitch Greenhill, (Manny's son), through Folklore Productions.

On 25 July 1968 Jackie was master of ceremonies for a political rally supporting anti-Vietnam War presidential candidate Eugene McCarthy held at the Red Sox' Fenway Park.

As the first performer to headline the Caffè Lena in Saratoga Springs, New York,  in 1960, Jackie was invited back 22 January 2010 to perform as part of an ongoing celebration of the club's 50th anniversary, with Bill Staines as the opening act.
On 1 Feb 2013 he returned to Club Passim (formerly Club 47) in Cambridge, Mass.

His first album in 45 years, Curbside Cotillion, was released in 2012, his first recording as Jack Landrón.
He is featured in the documentary For the Love of the Music: the Club 47 Folk Revival (2013).
On 19 Dec 2014 Landrón spoke at the Cambridge Forum in Harvard Square, Massachusetts, about his experiences during Freedom Summer's voter registration drive in Mississippi in 1964. This appearance can be viewed on YouTube.

Actor

Washington y Landrón relocated to Manhattan to pursue acting under the name of Jack Landrón. One of his earliest performances was in the 1966 National Educational Television production of Tennessee Williams' one-act play Ten Blocks on the Camino Real (1948), starring Lotte Lenya and Martin Sheen; this has been available on DVD. He has done extensive work in commercials and continues to compose.

Landrón is a member of the board of the New York Screen Actors' Guild.

In the fall of 2007 Landrón appeared in Maxwell Anderson’s Night Over Taos, directed by Estelle Parsons..

In 2009 he relocated to West Hollywood, Los Angeles to pursue work in television and film. He currently lives in Los Angeles' Chinatown.

Landrón has two daughters.

Further reading
 Baby, Let Me Follow You Down: The Illustrated Story of the Cambridge Folk Years by Eric Von Schmidt and Jim Rooney, 1979 (out of print)
 Josh White: Society Blues by Elijah Wald (2000); dedicated to Landrón.

References

External links
  Jackie's current music website 
Illustrated Jackie Washington discography  begins with Jackie Washington Landrón and then goes on to the Canadian Jackie Washington
An article about Jackie Washington's return to Club Passim (formerly Club 47) in 1997
fuller acting credits than most sites

TV work
Cuban/Latino Theater Archive
 Answers.com gets his birthyear (1938) wrong
thumbnail bio, also wrong on birthyear

American folk singers
Living people
1938 births